MPP or M.P.P. may refer to:
 Marginal physical product
 Master of Public Policy, an academic degree
 Member of Provincial Parliament (Ontario), Canada
 Member of Provincial Parliament (Western Cape), South Africa
 Merriweather Post Pavilion, an album released in 2009 by Animal Collective
 Migrant Protection Protocols of the U.S. Citizenship and Immigration Service

Groups and organizations 
 Marijuana Policy Project, US
 Medicines Patent Pool, UN
 Mongolian People's Party
 Mouvement du Peuple pour le Progrès (People's Movement for Progress), Burkina Faso
 Movement for a People's Party, US
 Movement of Popular Participation, Uruguay

Companies 
 Micro Precision Products, a British camera manufacturer

Science and technology 
 Maximum Power Point
 1-Methyl-4-phenylpyridine (MPP+), a toxic molecule
 Methylpiperidinopyrazole, a highly selective antagonist of ERα
 Micro perforated plate, as a sound absorber
 Molypermalloy powder core, a magnetic core in electronics
 Multipotent progenitor of hematopoietic stem cells

Computation 
 Massive parallel processing
 Goodyear MPP or Goodyear Massively Parallel Processor
 MPP (file format), of Microsoft Project Plan

Other uses 
 Metroid Prime Pinball, a Nintendo DS video game